Ryszard Gajewski (born 5 October 1954 in Zakopane) is a Polish mountaineer best known for the first winter ascent of Manaslu on 12 January 1984 together with Maciej Berbeka.

Eight-thousanders
 Manaslu (8156 m.) with Maciej Berbeka
 Cho Oyu (8201 m.) with Maciej Pawlikowski

References
MountEverest.net Polish mountaineering timeline 

1954 births
Living people
Polish mountain climbers
Sportspeople from Zakopane